Krishna II (reigned 878–914 CE) ascended the Rashtrakuta throne after the demise of his famous father Amoghavarsha I Nrupatunga. His Kannada name was Kannara. His queen was a Haihaya princess of Chedi called Mahadevi. From the chronology of inscriptions that mention the name of this king, it seems Krishna II may have started to rule even during the lifetime of his father. The fact that Amoghavarsha in his last years renounced the affairs of the state in religious pursuits supports this claim. The rule of Krishna II saw significant advances in literature,  although in the affairs of expansion of the empire, his reign was mixed. During his reign he cultivated matrimonial alliance with Chedis to form military gain.

Vengi affairs
His rule was one of mixed fortunes. He suffered some reversals against the Eastern Chalukyas ruled by King Gunaga Vijyaditya III whose commander pursued Krishna II to central India. After the death of Vijayaditya III, Krishna II continued hostilities against Chalukya Bhima I in 892 and succeeded in defeating him and taking him prisoner. However, Bhima I later freed himself and pushed back the Rashtrakutas from Vengi and crowned himself king. A few years later, Krishna II suffered two more defeats at the hands of the Vengi Chalukyas at Niravadyapura and Peruvanguru. However other sources claim Krishna II conquered Andhra.

Deccan and northern affairs
Krishna II defeated the Gurjara Bhoja I of Prathihara dynasty of Gujarat, merging the Lata line (Gujarat) of Rashtrakutas to bring it under his direct rule from Manyakheta. He defeated the kingdoms of Banga, Kalinga, Magadha. It is claimed his kingdom extended from the Ganges river in the north to Cape Comorin in the south. He held titles such as Akalavarsha and Shubatunga.

Tamil politics
His daughter had married the Chola king Aditya I. With this the king had hoped to achieve influence in Tamil country. After the death of Aditya I, instead of his grandson Kannara ascending the throne, Parantaka became the king. Krishna II then invaded the Tamil kingdom with the help of his feudatories, the Banas and the Vaidumbas rulers, hoping to force the issue. He failed to consolidate his influence on the Cholas. The Rashtrakutas suffered a defeat in the battle of Vallala at the hands of Cholas under Parantaka in 916.

Notes

References

External links
  History of Karnataka, Mr. Arthikaje

914 deaths
Hindu monarchs
10th-century rulers in Asia
Rashtrakuta dynasty
9th-century rulers in Asia